BERYTAR is a submarine telecommunications cable system in the Mediterranean Sea linking Syria and Lebanon.

It has landing points in:

 Beirut, Lebanon
 Saida, Lebanon
 Trablous, Lebanon
 Tartous, Syria

It has a design transmission capacity of 5 Gbit/s and a total cable length of 134 km.  It started operation on 7 April 1997.

The owners are:
 Lebanese Ministry of Telecommunications
 Syrian Telecommunications Establishment

References

 

Submarine communications cables in the Mediterranean Sea
Lebanon–Syria relations
1997 establishments in Lebanon
1997 establishments in Syria